Shane Howell (born November 28, 1983), is an American mixed martial artist who most recently competed in the flyweight division of the Ultimate Fighting Championship. A professional MMA competitor since 2007, Howell has also competed for the promotions Bellator MMA and King of the Cage.

Ultimate Fighting Championship
Howell amassed a record of 13-7 before joining the Ultimate Fighting Championship in 2014.

Howell made his UFC debut replacing an injured Ryan Benoit against Ray Borg on June 28, 2014 at UFC Fight Night 44. He lost the fight via submission in the first round.

Howell faced Paddy Holohan on January 18, 2015 at UFC Fight Night 59. He lost the fight by unanimous decision and was subsequently released from the organization.

Championships and accomplishments
Xtreme Fighting League
XFL Bantamweight Championship (One time)

Mixed martial arts record

|-
|Loss
|align=center|13–10
|Ryan Hollis
|Decision (unanimous)
|Freestyle Cage Fighting 50
|
|align=center|5
|align=center|5:00
|Shawnee, Oklahoma, United States
|
|-
|Loss
|align=center|13–9
|Paddy Holohan
|Decision (unanimous)
|UFC Fight Night: McGregor vs. Siver
|
|align=center|3
|align=center|5:00
|Boston, Massachusetts, United States
|
|-
|Loss
|align=center|13–8
|Ray Borg
|Technical Submission (rear-naked choke)
|UFC Fight Night: Swanson vs. Stephens
|
|align=center|1
|align=center|2:17
|San Antonio, Texas, United States
|
|-
|Win
|align=center|13–7
|Jimmy Van Horn
|TKO (punches)
|KOTC - Prohibited
|
|align=center|2
|align=center|2:40
|Norman, Oklahoma, United States
|
|-
|Win
|align=center|12–7
|Daniel Armendariz
|TKO (punches)
|Harrah Fight Night
|
|align=center|1
|align=center|4:34
|Harrah, Oklahoma, United States
|
|-
|Win
|align=center|11–7
|Francisco Barragan
|Decision (unanimous)
|Freestyle Cage Fighting 48
|
|align=center|3
|align=center|5:00
|Shawnee, Oklahoma, United States
|
|-
|Win
|align=center|10–7
|Mark Oshiro
|Submission (D'arce choke)
|Bellator 42
|
|align=center|1
|align=center|4:15
|Concho, Oklahoma, United States
|
|-
|Win
|align=center|9–7
|Tony Quintero
|Submission (choke)
|Freestyle Cage Fighting 46
|
|align=center|1
|align=center|1:17
|Shawnee, Oklahoma, United States
|
|-
|Win
|align=center|8–7
|Lewis McKenzie
|Submission (guillotine choke)
|Xtreme Fighting League
|
|align=center|4
|align=center|1:44
|Tulsa, Oklahoma, United States
|
|-
|Loss
|align=center|7–7
|Jason Sampson
|Submission (choke)
|Bricktown Brawl 5
|
|align=center|1
|align=center|4:14
|Oklahoma City, Oklahoma, United States
|
|-
|Win
|align=center|7–6
|Christopher Hanes
|Submission (choke)
|Red Dragon Promotions: Enter the Septagon
|
|align=center|1
|align=center|1:22
|Lawton, Oklahoma, United States
|
|-
|Win
|align=center|6–6
|Lewis McKenzie
|TKO (punches)
|5150 Combat League / Xtreme Fighting League
|
|align=center|1
|align=center|2:44
|Tulsa, Oklahoma, United States
|
|-
|Win
|align=center|5–6
|Kody Powell
|Submission (armbar)
|5150 Combat League: Seasons Beatings
|
|align=center|1
|align=center|3:52
|Tulsa, Oklahoma, United States
|
|-
|Loss
|align=center|4–6
|Jerod Spoon
|Decision (unanimous)
|Bricktown Brawl 2
|
|align=center|3
|align=center|5:00
|Oklahoma City, Oklahoma, United States
|
|-
|Win
|align=center|4–5
|Tim Elliott
|Submission (triangle choke)
|Harrah Fight Night
|
|align=center|3
|align=center|2:25
|Harrah, Oklahoma, United States
|
|-
|Loss
|align=center|3–5
|Danny Times
|Submission (rear-naked choke)
|HRP - Snakebite Fight 2
|
|align=center|1
|align=center|0:53
|Tulsa, Oklahoma, United States
|
|-
|Loss
|align=center|3–4
|Dan Sulivan
|TKO (punches)
|Freestyle Cage Fighting 21
|
|align=center|2
|align=center|1:08
|Tulsa, Oklahoma, United States
|
|-
|Loss
|align=center|3–3
|Joe Coca
|Submission (rear-naked choke)
|Freestyle Cage Fighting 17
|
|align=center|2
|align=center|2:04
|Shawnee, Oklahoma, United States
|
|-
|Win
|align=center|3–2
|Cody Castillo
|TKO (punches)
|Freestyle Cage Fighting 15
|
|align=center|1
|align=center|0:55
|Shawnee, Oklahoma, United States
|
|-
|Loss
|align=center|2–2
|Jared Lopez
|Decision (unanimous)
|Freestyle Cage Fighting 14
|
|align=center|3
|align=center|3:00
|Shawnee, Oklahoma, United States
|
|-
|Loss
|align=center|2–1
|Josh Duplar
|Submission (rear-naked choke) 
|Freestyle Cage Fighting 11
|
|align=center|1
|align=center|0:52
|Shawnee, Oklahoma, United States
|
|-
|Win
|align=center|2–0
|Victor Veloquio
|Submission (guillotine choke)
|Freestyle Cage Fighting 9
|
|align=center|3
|align=center|0:28
|Ponca City, Oklahoma, United States
|
|-
|Win
|align=center|1–0
|Arnulfo Veloquio
|Decision (unanimous)
|Freestyle Cage Fighting 7
|
|align=center|3
|align=center|3:00
|Shawnee, Oklahoma, United States
|

See also
 List of current UFC fighters
 List of male mixed martial artists

References

External links

UFC Profile

Living people
American male mixed martial artists
1983 births
Ultimate Fighting Championship male fighters